Çlirim Bashi (born 5 February 1971) is an Albanian former professional footballer who played as a defender. He made two appearances for the Albania national team in 2000.

References

External links
 

1971 births
Living people
Albanian footballers
Association football defenders
Albania international footballers
2. Bundesliga players
KF Vllaznia Shkodër players
FV Speyer players
SV Waldhof Mannheim players
Alemannia Aachen players
Albanian expatriate footballers
Albanian expatriate sportspeople in Germany
Expatriate footballers in Germany
Place of birth missing (living people)